Carlos Alfredo Labrín Candia (born 2 December 1990) is a Chilean footballer who plays for Audax Italiano in his country's top-level.

Club career
Born in Mulchén, Labrín joined Huachipato youth set-up as a youngster. In 2008, he was promoted to the first-adult team and was quickly established as a starter centre back after his impressive performances during the Torneo Clausura.

On 28 January 2011 Palermo chairman Maurizio Zamparini confirmed the acquisition of Labrín, effective from July 2011, for €1.3 million. He moved on loan to Novara in August 2011. He debuted with the piemotesi on 29 November against Catania in Coppa Italia.

He moved back to Palermo during the winter transfer window due to lack of first team opportunities at Novara. He made his Palermo debut only on 18 March 2012, as a surprise starting pick in an unusual 3–5–2 formation for a Serie A league game against Lecce, then being named in the starting lineup also for the two following games against Udinese and Bologna.

In January 2013 he returned to Huachipato — freshly Chilean football champion in the age — in a loan agreement until the end of the year. There Labrín played the most of the team games in the year, including Copa Libertadores where he performed well in a 2–1 away win over Brazil's Grêmio in their new stadium. On 1 January 2014 he reached a six month-loan extension with Palermo for play at Huachipato, but coach Mario Salas not considered much him.

Following the differences mentioned with Salas, on 15 July 2014, Labrín moved to San Marcos de Arica where played all the games of the season.

After a year at Arica y Parinacota Region–based team he joined Audax Italiano to face the 2015–16 season.

International career
In 2007, Labrín was called up to play with national under-17 team the FIFA category's World Cup qualifying which Chile failed to reach. In 2018, he represented Chile U23 at the 2008 Inter Continental Cup in Malaysia, scoring a goal. A year later he was nominated to the South American U-20 Championship at Venezuela by coach Ivo Basay which Chile neither qualified. However months later with the U-23 team, he as captain was champion of Toulon Tournament in France where was the tournament's best player.

On 29 August 2010, Labrín was selected for the first time to the senior side by manager Marcelo Bielsa, for a game against Ukraine at Kyiv.

Honours

Club
Huachipato
Copa Chile: Runner-up 2013–14

International
Toulon Tournament: 2009

References

External links
 BDFA profile

1990 births
Living people
People from Bío Bío Province
Chilean footballers
Chile international footballers
Chile under-20 international footballers
Chile youth international footballers
Chilean expatriate footballers
Association football defenders
C.D. Huachipato footballers
Novara F.C. players
Palermo F.C. players
San Marcos de Arica footballers
Audax Italiano footballers
Chilean Primera División players
Serie A players
Expatriate footballers in Italy
Chilean expatriate sportspeople in Italy